Raintown is the debut album by Scottish pop rock band Deacon Blue. The album, written largely by lead singer Ricky Ross, was released in the United Kingdom on 26 May 1987. It proved a commercial success and has to date sold around a million copies, peaking in the UK Albums Chart at no. 14 and remaining in the charts for a year and a half.

The album, widely praised as Deacon Blue's finest work, has the overtones of a concept album relating to the struggles of urban life in the inner city.  The city being unmistakably Glasgow, referenced by the roots of the band and by the images by photographer Oscar Marzaroli on the cover of the album: the view of a rainy day over Glasgow's West End (with the Finnieston Crane featuring prominently).

Background

The short intro, "Born in a Storm", melodic and interspersed with an unmistakably gloomy atmosphere created by the name, launches into the title track "Raintown", a natural extension of this plot. The weather remains a feature of the atmosphere of the album, reflecting the epitome of the Scots word dreich. Played out in the course of the album is the struggle with money ("Loaded"), unemployment, dreams of something better ("Dignity", "The Very Thing"), culminating in an angry attack upon urban life ("Town to Be Blamed").  The album does feature lighter experiences though, with the love songs ("Chocolate Girl") and "Love's Great Fears" - a track that Ross has often cited as his all-time favourite, featuring a slide guitar outro by Chris Rea.

In an interview given to the Daily Record in 2012, songwriter Ricky Ross explained the rationale and reasoning behind the writing of all of the songs on the album.

Legacy

On 27 February 2006, Raintown was reissued as part of Columbia's Legacy Edition series. The re-issue was expanded to 2 CDs. The first CD featured the original 11-track album. The second CD featured alternate cuts of all 11 album tracks, as well as the two original CD bonus tracks "Riches" and "Kings of the Western World".

The new edition did not include the varied bonus cuts (remixes and b-sides) that were found on the singles from the album.

Another reissue was released on 22 October 2012 by Edsel Records as part of a catalogue reissue program for the band's first five studio albums. This set contained all of the B-sides and remixes associated with the album, as well as also including the Legacy Edition bonus disc.

Track listing
All songs written by Ricky Ross, except where noted:

Original 1987 album 

 "Born in a Storm"– 1:33
 "Raintown" – 3:50
 "Ragman" – 3:08
 "He Looks Like Spencer Tracy Now" – 3:50
 "Loaded" (James Prime, Ricky Ross, Graeme Kelling) – 4:29
 "When Will You (Make My Telephone Ring)" – 5:05
 "Chocolate Girl" – 3:18
 "Dignity" – 4:00
 "The Very Thing" – 3:34
 "Love's Great Fears" (Ricky Ross, James Prime) – 3:42
 "Town to Be Blamed" (Ricky Ross, James Prime) – 5:19

CD Bonus Tracks (UK Release)

 "Riches" – 2:39
 "Kings of the Western World" – 2:39

Legacy Edition Bonus CD [2006]

2012 Edsel Records Reissue

Personnel

Deacon Blue

Ricky Ross – lead vocals (additional guitar, piano & keyboard on bonus tracks on reissue version)
Lorraine McIntosh – backing & harmony vocals
Graeme Kelling – guitar, low voice
James Prime – keyboards, backing vocals
Ewen Vernal – bass guitar, backing vocals
Dougie Vipond – drums, percussion

Additional musicians
Chris Rea - slide guitar on "Love's Great Fears"
B.J. Cole - pedal steel guitar on "Chocolate Girl"
Jimmy Helms, George Chandler, Jimmy Chambers (Londonbeat) - backing vocals on "When Will You (Make My Telephone Ring)"

References

External links
Deacon Blue's official website page on the album
The TIME magazine article that inspired the title for the song He Looks Like Spencer Tracy Now

1987 debut albums
Deacon Blue albums
Albums produced by Jon Kelly
Columbia Records albums